Caro Roma (1866–1937) was the stage name of Carrie Northey, an American singer and composer known for Tin Pan Alley era songs.

Biography
Carrie Northey (Northly has been cited, but Federal Census records and her obituary and death record insist on Northey) was born in California during the gold rush and began performing on stage at age three. She studied in Boston at the New England Conservatory of Music and as a teenager toured in Canada as orchestra conductor for a French opera company. She became prima donna with the Henry Savage Opera Company in Boston and sang opera in the United States and in Europe, also performing for royalty. Northey wrote songs and poetry as a child and developed her composition skills during her years as a performer. In 1932 at age 71, Northey performed nineteen of her songs at a concert in Los Angeles. She died in California.

Works
Besides her Tin Pan Alley song, Northey wrote sea songs and composed at least one song cycle. Selected works include: 
 
Can't Yo' Heah Me Callin' Caroline (1914)
The Wandering One, song cycle, lyrics by Clement Scott
Faded Rose
The Angelus,
Thinking of Thee
Resignation

In collaboration with composer Ernest R. Ball, she also wrote the lyrics for:
In The Garden Of My Heart
Love Me Today
Tomorrow May Never Come

References

1866 births
1937 deaths
19th-century classical composers
20th-century classical composers
American women composers
American music educators
Women classical composers
19th-century American composers
20th-century American women musicians
20th-century American composers
Women music educators
20th-century women composers
19th-century women composers
19th-century American women musicians